Corrales is municipality in the Tundama Province of the Colombian Department of Boyacá, with a population of 2,481 according to the 2005 Census.

History

The locality was founded on January 28, 1782 by Vizente de Rivera y Mendoza. Three battles were fought there between 6 and 10 July 1819, during Bolívar's campaign to liberate New Granada.

References

Municipalities of Boyacá Department